Hugh Smith Cumming Jr. (March 10, 1900 – November 24, 1986) was a career Foreign Service Officer from 1933 until 1963 when he retired. During these 30 years, he was a United States diplomat who was United States Ambassador to Indonesia from 1953 to 1957 and then Director of the Bureau of Intelligence and Research from 1957 to 1961.

Biography

Cumming was born in Richmond, Virginia on March 10, 1900, the son of Hugh Smith Cumming Sr. (1869–1948) and his wife, Lucy Booth Cumming (1871–1960).

During World War I, Cumming served in the United States Army.  After the war, he received a law degree from the University of Virginia School of Law in 1924.

Cumming Jr married Winifred Burney West (1907-1978)
As a member of the United States Department of State, Cumming served as counsel to the United States Embassy in Sweden and then in the U.S. Embassy in Russia.

In 1953, President of the United States Dwight D. Eisenhower named Cumming United States Ambassador to Indonesia.  Cumming presented his credentials on October 15, 1953, and held the post until March 3, 1957.

In 1957, President Eisenhower nominated Cumming to be the 1st ever Director of the Bureau of Intelligence and Research within the U.S. Department of State.  He held this office from October 10, 1957, until February 19, 1961. He retired as a Foreign Service Officer in 1963.

Hugh Smith Cumming Jr died on November 24, 1986, and was buried in the Saint Johns Church Cemetery in Hampton, Hampton City, Virginia. (See: findagrave.com)

References

Notes
Profile from Political Graveyard
Cumming family papers at the University of Virginia
Webpage of the Hugh S. and Winifred B. Cumming Memorial Professorship in International Affairs

1900 births
1986 deaths
Ambassadors of the United States to Indonesia
Lawyers from Richmond, Virginia
Military personnel from Richmond, Virginia
United States Army personnel of World War I
University of Virginia School of Law alumni
Assistant Secretaries of State for Intelligence and Research
United States Foreign Service personnel
20th-century American lawyers